Mohamed Mursal Sheikh Abdurahman is the former speaker of the Somali parliament, who was elected on 30 April 2018. Born in Baidoa, Somalia, he previously served as Minister of Defence (Somalia) as well as Minister of Energy and Water Resources, Minister of National Assets and Public Procurement deputy district commissioner of Baidoa District of Somalia, and member of the Transitional Federal Parliament. He was also the Ambassador of the Somali Federal Republic to the Republic of Turkey.

On December 12, 2018, it was reported that Mursal had relocated from his residence inside Villa Somalia, to a house near the airport as disputes with his deputies over impeachment of President Mohamed Farmaajo and the fate of the House Budget Committee continued.

He no longer became speaker when Aden Madobe took over as the next Speaker of Parliament.

References

Net worth
162 million American Dollars (Ruff Estimate)

Living people
Year of birth missing (living people)
Speakers of the Transitional Federal Parliament
Government ministers of Somalia
People from Bay, Somalia